Frank Cody High School is a high school in Detroit, Michigan, United States. Named to honor a former superintendent of Detroit Public Schools, it opened in 1952.

History
The school opened in 1952.  
Cody absorbed attendance area from Redford and Mackenzie High School, after both facilities closed in 2007.

As of January 2016 there are three separate high school programs sharing space at Cody.
During the summer of 2018 all three existing academies at the high school (Academy of Public Leadership, Medicine and Community Health, and Detroit Institute of Technology) were reunited to move forward as Cody High School for the 2018-2019 school year.

Notable alumni
 Don Anderson, former NFL player. 
 Andrew Davison, former NFL player. Left after his Freshman season
Tee Grizzley, rapper and musician
 Gary Kapanowski, LGBT union organizer and political activist. 
 Gene Taylor, TV host and comedian.
 Nicci Gilbert (singer), actress, singer, reality show star

Campus
The school campus has polished tile, hardwood floors, and oak cabinets. John Wisely of the Detroit Free Press wrote that these touches "hint at a time when money was abundant."

The school still maintains many of the original wood cabinets and fixtures.

References

External links

 Cody High School

Public high schools in Michigan
Educational institutions established in 1955
High schools in Detroit
1955 establishments in Michigan
Detroit Public Schools Community District